Bannereus anomalus is a species of shrimp of the family Alpheidae, in the monotypic genus Bannerus.

References

Alpheidae
Monotypic crustacean genera